Alessandro Borghi (1559 – 9 August 1613) was a Roman Catholic prelate who served as Bishop of Sansepolcro (1598–1605).

Biography
Alessandro Borghi was born in Modigliana, Italy in 1559.
On 22 June 1598, he was appointed during the papacy of Pope Clement VIII as Bishop of Sansepolcro.
He served as Bishop of Sansepolcro until his resignation in December 1605. 
He died on 9 August 1613.

Episcopal succession

References 

16th-century Italian Roman Catholic bishops
17th-century Italian Roman Catholic bishops
Bishops appointed by Pope Clement VIII
1559 births
1613 deaths